List matches of Polish men's volleyball national team conducted by Stéphane Antiga, who was announced a coach of Polish national team on October 24, 2013.

Achievements

Official matches

2015 European Championship qualification

2014 FIVB World League

Pool A

2014 FIVB World Championship

 All times are Central European Summer Time (UTC+02:00)

Pool A

Pool E

Pool H

Semifinal

Final

2015 FIVB World League

Pool B

Final round
 All times are Brasília Time (UTC−03:00).

Pool J

Semifinal

3rd place

2015 FIVB World Cup

 All times are Japan Standard Time (UTC+09:00).

First round (Site B)

Second round (Site B)

Third round (Site A)

2015 European Championship

 All times are Eastern European Summer Time (UTC+03:00).

Pool C

Quarterfinal

2016 Summer Olympics – European qualification

 All times are Central European Time (UTC+01:00).

Pool A

Semifinal

3rd place match

2016 World Olympic Qualification Tournament

 All times are Japan Standard Time (UTC+09:00).

World qualification

2016 FIVB World League

Intercontinental round

Pool C1

Pool D1

Pool G1

Final round

Pool K1

2016 Olympic Games

 All times are Brasília Time (UTC−03:00).

Group B

Quarterfinal

Friendly matches

2014 Memoriał Huberta Jerzego Wagnera

2015 Memoriał Huberta Jerzego Wagnera

2016 Memoriał Huberta Jerzego Wagnera

Polish men's volleyball national team